The Microlophus theresioides (common name in Spanish is Corredor de Pica) is a species of lava lizard endemic to Chile.

References

theresioides
Lizards of South America
Endemic fauna of Chile
Reptiles of Chile
Reptiles described in 1966
Taxa named by Roberto Donoso-Barros